"Fine Line" is a 1984  single by Barry Gibb. The song was written by Gibb and keyboardist George Bitzer. It is the second and final single from his debut solo album Now Voyager. It was released in October 1984 in North America by MCA Records and in most countries by Polydor Records. The song was failed to chart in the United States, but it did manage to reach #50 on the Hot Dance Club Songs. The 12" version of this song was remixed by Larry Patterson. This single was less successful than his previous single, "Shine, Shine".

Recording
"Fine Line" was recorded as a demo in November or December 1983 in Miami Beach with "Face to Face", "The Hunter", "One Night (For Lovers)" and "The Hunter". The song features The Who's lead singer Roger Daltrey singing backing vocals along with Olivia Newton-John and Harry Wayne Casey of KC and the Sunshine Band.

The song also contains a rap section by Gibb himself:

Music video
The music video of "Fine Line" was made as a part of Gibb's movie Now Voyager on which all songs on his album of the same name was featured. For "Fine Line", it was filmed in a black and white. Gibb had his trademark beard shaven off in this video. He also shaved his beard on the Bee Gees' music video "Night Fever" and the alternative music videos of "How Deep Is Your Love" and "Stayin' Alive".

Track listing

Charts

References

1984 singles
Barry Gibb songs
Songs written by Barry Gibb
Song recordings produced by Barry Gibb
Polydor Records singles
MCA Records singles
1984 songs